Southern Thule is a collection of the three southernmost islands in the South Sandwich Islands: Bellingshausen, Cook, and Thule (Morrell). The island group is barren, windswept, bitterly cold, and uninhabited. It has an extensive exclusive economic zone rich in marine living resources managed as part of the SGSSI fisheries. The Admiralty's Antarctic Pilot says that Southern Thule is part of an old sunken volcano, and is covered with ash and penguin guano. There are seals, petrels, and a bank of kelp just offshore, especially around a small inlet on Morrell called Ferguson Bay.

History 
The island group was first sighted in 1775 by the expedition of James Cook, who named it Southern Thule because it seemed to lie at very much the extreme end of the world (see Ultima Thule). It was further explored in 1820 by Fabian Gottlieb von Bellingshausen who established that it consisted of three separate islands.

The Southern Thule territory has been administered by the United Kingdom since 1908 and also claimed by Argentina since 1938.

Argentine occupation 1976–1982 
In November 1976, a party from the Argentine Air Force landed on Thule and constructed a small military base complete with barracks and a concrete helicopter landing pad. They set up a weather station, a radio station, and a flagpole from which the Argentine flag flew. The base was named Corbeta Uruguay.

In December 1976, the British discovered what had happened. The Argentine action became the subject of British protests, the first of them on 19 January 1977. In November 1977, under the name Operation Journeyman, Britain sent a naval taskforce consisting of the nuclear-powered submarine , two frigates, and two support vessels, in order to deter any threat to the Falklands, but ruled out using direct force to end the occupation of Southern Thule.

Arrangements to legitimise the station were discussed in 1978 but failed. More than a year went by before word of the occupation of Southern Thule leaked out to the public. Argentine forces remained on Southern Thule during the 1982 Falklands War. On 20 June 1982, six days after the war had ended and as part of Operation Keyhole, Royal Marines landed and the Argentine garrison, outnumbered and outgunned, surrendered and relinquished its weapons.

Aftermath 
After the surrender, Southern Thule was left unoccupied. Six months later, a passing British warship noticed that the Union Flag had been taken down from the flagpole and the flag of Argentina run up in its place.  The military was ordered to destroy all buildings on Southern Thule, leaving Corbeta Uruguay unfit for prolonged habitation. By Christmas 1982, the barrack block, mess room, and meteorological station had been destroyed.

References

External links

Bibliography
 Simon Winchester, Outposts: Journeys to the Surviving Relics of the British Empire, Harper Perennial, 2004 (originally published in 1987).

Islands of the South Sandwich Islands
Volcanoes of the Atlantic Ocean
Volcanoes of South Georgia and the South Sandwich Islands
Uninhabited islands of South Georgia and the South Sandwich Islands
Falklands War in South Georgia